Martin Simonson is a Swedish scholar, novelist, and translator, specialized in fantasy literature and science fiction. He teaches at the University of the Basque Country in Spain, and is mainly known for being the Spanish translator of some of the works of J.R.R. Tolkien.

Simonson, who was born in Göteborg, Sweden, in 1973, holds a Ph.D. in English literature (March 2006).
Before moving to Spain, he studied psychology, anthropology and creative writing at the University of Göteborg and Fridhems Folkhögskola. He is the author of various novels, among others The Wind of the Wild Lands, the first part of the saga The Faceless Keeper, which takes place in a parallel world and explores themes of identity, personal relationships, the power of nature and spirituality. He has written and edited a number of books on fantasy, science fiction, Western American literature and Gothic horror, and he has translated novels, plays, and graphic novels from English, Swedish and Norwegian into Spanish. Simonson has also published various books and articles on the works of J.R.R. Tolkien and on the representation of nature in fantasy literature, most recently From East to West: The Portrayal of Nature in British Fantasy and its Projection in Ursula K. Le Guin's Western American "Earthsea", published in 2021.

Academic books
From East to West: The Portrayal of Nature in British Fantasy and its Projection in Ursula K. Le Guin's Western American "Earthsea". With Jon Alkorta. Peter Lang, 2021.  
J.R.R. Tolkien y la Tierra Media: Once ensayos sobre el mayor mito literario del siglo XX. (Edition, selection, translation and introduction). With José R. Montejano. Jonathan Alwars, 2021.  
El Oeste recuperado: La literatura del pasado y la construcción de personajes en «El Señor de los Anillos». Peter Lang, 2019.  
El Western fantástico de Stephen King (with Raúl Montero), Peter Lang, 2017 
Representations of Nature in Middle-earth (Editor), Walking Tree Publishers, 2015 
El héroe del oeste en las Crónicas de Narnia (with Raúl Montero), Peter Lang, 2014 
A Contested West: New Readings of Place in Western American Literature (Editor, with David Rio and Amaia Ibarraran), Portal Education, 2013 
The Neglected West: Contemporary Approaches to Western American Literature (Editor, with Amaia Ibarraran and David Rio), Portal Education, 2012 
Beyond the Myth: New Perspectives on Western Texts (Editor, with David Rio and Amaia Ibarraran), Portal Education, 2011, 
The Lord of the Rings and the Western Narrative Tradition, Walking Tree Publishers, 2008, 
J.R.R. Tolkien. Mitopoeia y mitología (Edition, selection and introduction). Essays on J.R.R. Tolkien by Eduardo Segura Fernández. PortalEditions, 2008,

Anthologies and critical editions 
Two British Satires: Gulliver's Travels and The Rivals (Critical edition), Roots of Europe, 2021 
Gothic Horror: The Castle of Otranto and The Monk (Introduction), Portal Publishing, 2016 
Cuentos del Romanticismo alemán (Editor), Portal Publishing, 2015 
English Poetry 1783-1916: Essential Short Lyrics of the Romantic, Victorian and Edwardian Eras (Editor, introduction, with Raul Montero), Portal Publishing, 2014 
Los Cuentos de Grimm (Editor, critical introduction and notes with Miguel Ayerbe), PortalEditions, 2010

Novels
Rayos de un sol quebrado, Sapere Aude, 2021 
Rörelser i skogen (with Per Johansson and Thomas Örn Karlsson, Skymning Förlag, 2018) 
Golgrim's Keys (with Raúl Montero, translation into English by Joe Jenner, PortalEditions, 2008) 
Shadows in the Woods (translation into English by Robert Birch, PortalEditions, 2010) 
Anatomy of Air (with Raúl Montero, translation into English by Robert Birch, PortalEditions, 2011)

Translations 
La naturaleza de la Tierra Media, original title The Nature of Middle-earth by J.R.R. Tolkien, Minotauro, 2022 
Hambre, original title Epidemin by Åsa Ericsdotter, Ediciones B, 2021 
Los mundos de J. R. R. Tolkien: Los lugares que inspiraron al escritor, original title The Worlds of J.R.R. Tolkien by John Garth, Minotauro, 2021 
Tolkien. Creador de la Tierra Media, original title Tolkien. Maker of Middle-earth by Catherine McIlwaine, Minotauro, 2020 
Cartas de Papá Noel, original title The Father Christmas Letters by J.R.R. Tolkien, Minotauro, 2019 
La Caída de Gondolin, original title The Fall of Gondolin by J.R.R. Tolkien, Minotauro, 2019 
El niño en la nieve, original title Gutten som elsket rådyr by Samuel Bjørk, Suma, 2019 
Beren y Lúthien, original title Beren and Lúthien by J.R.R. Tolkien, Minotauro, 2018 
Las confesiones de Himmler, original title SS-ledaren Himmlers innersta hemligheter by Arno Kersten, Pasado y Presente, 2017 
El búho, original title Uglen by Samuel Bjørk, Suma de Letras, 2016 
La historia de Kullervo, original title The Story of Kullervo by J.R.R. Tolkien, Minotauro, 2016 
El Señor de los Anillos: Guía de lectura (with Simon Saito, Nur Ferrante and José Elías Álamo Gómez), original title The Lord of the Rings: Reader's Guide" by Wayne Hammond and Christina Scull, Minotauro, 2015 Beowulf: Traducción y comentario, incluye Sellic Spell (with Nur Ferrante y Óscar Muñoz), original title Beowulf: A Translation and Commentary, with Sellic Spell by J.R.R. Tolkien, Minotauro, 2015 Tolkien y la Gran Guerra (with Eduardo Segura), original title "Tolkien and the Great War: The Threshold of Middle-earth" by John Garth, Minotauro, 2014, Viajo sola, original title Det henger en engel allene i skogen by Samuel Bjørk, Suma de Letras, 2014, Bésame primero, original title "Kiss Me First", by Lottie Mogach, Suma de Letras, 2014, Ocultos, original title "Stallo" by Stefan Spjut, Planeta Internacional, 2013, La batalla que conmocionó Europa: Poltava y el nacimiento del Imperio ruso, original title Poltava, by Peter Englund (Roca Editorial, 2012) Invasión!, original title Invasion! by Jonas Hassen Khemiri, Ediciones Irreverentes, 2012 Montecore - Un tigre único, original title Montecore - En unik tiger by Jonas Hassen Khemiri, Miscelánea, Roca Editorial, 2011 Una vida de lujo, original title Livet deluxe by Jens Lapidus, Suma de Letras, Grupo Santillana, 2011 Boardwalk Empire, original title Boardwalk Empire by Nelson Johnson, Suma de Letras, Grupo Santillana, 2011 The Pacific, original title The Pacific by Hugh Ambrose, (Suma de Letras, Grupo Santillana, 2011 Nunca la jodas, original title Aldrig Fucka Upp by Jens Lapidus, Suma de Letras, Grupo Santillana, 2010 Guerra de bandas 145, original title Gängkrig 145'' by Jens Lapidus, Suma de Letras, Grupo Santillana, 2010

References

External links
Interview (in Spanish), Círculo de Lovecraft
Interview in Spanish, Ocio Zero
Website of Walking Tree Publishers, includes reviews
Review of J.R.R. Tolkien. Mitopoeia y mitología in Torre del Virrey (in Spanish)

1973 births
Living people
People from Gothenburg
21st-century Swedish novelists
Swedish male novelists
Swedish translators
Tolkien studies
Swedish scholars and academics
Academic staff of the University of the Basque Country
British male novelists
University of Gothenburg alumni